Richard Anthony Arthur (January 20, 1937 – December 15, 2009) was an American author and educator.

Educated in Pennsylvania and later California, Arthur spent three years in the US Army before becoming a journalist in Arizona.  He returned to education and completed an MA in English at Penn State University and in 1970 completed his PhD in English.  He was a Fulbright Scholar

Arthur retired in 2002 from California State University, Northridge. He died in 2009.

Bibliography
 American Prose and Criticism, 1900-1950,  with Peter A. Brier, Gale Research, 1981
 Deliverance at Los Banos, St. Martin's Press, 1985
 Bushmasters, America's Jungle Warriors of World War II, St. Martin's Press, 1987
 The Tailor-King: The Rise and Fall of the Anabaptist Kingdom of Munster, New York: St. Martins Press,1999 
 Literary Feuds: A Century of Celebrated Quarrels--from Mark Twain to Tom Wolfe, New York: St. Martin's Press, 2002
 Clashes of Will: Great Confrontations That Have Shaped Modern America, with John Broesamle, 2004
 Twelve Great Clashes That Shaped Modern America: From Geronimo to George W. Bush, with John Broesamle, 2006
 Radical Innocent: Upton Sinclair, Random House, 2006
 General Jo Shelby's March, Random House, 2010

References

Pennsylvania State University alumni
California State University, Northridge faculty
1937 births
2009 deaths
20th-century American male writers